Silver Point School is an English-medium co-ed school located at 31/1, N.C Chowdhury road, Kolkata – 700042 (Junior) and located at 198/1,Kasba road Kolkata-700042 ( Senior). From class Nursery to class XII.

About School
The school was established in 1999 and is affiliated to the West Bengal Board of Secondary Education for Madhyamik Pariksha, and to the West Bengal Council of Higher Secondary Education for Higher Secondary Examination.

See also
Education in India
List of schools in India
Education in West Bengal

References

External links 
 

High schools and secondary schools in West Bengal
Schools in Kolkata
Educational institutions established in 1999
1999 establishments in West Bengal